Geneveve Casugod (born January 12, 1991) is a Filipino professional volleyball player who currently plays for the Cignal HD Spikers on the Premier Volleyball League. She was a former member of the collegiate varsity volleyball team of the Far Eastern University in its indoor games.  She is a former member of the Philippines women's national volleyball team.

Career
Casugod debuted in the 76th Season of UAAP Women's Volleyball with the FEU Tamaraws. She has been a part of the team for 2 years after she decided to leave due to her pregnancy. Casugod has been a big part of the FEU team after helping the team reach the Final Four on the 77th Season of UAAP. During the 11th Season of Shakey's V League on its first conference, Geneveve received her first medal, winning the title of the conference and the trophy along with the Lady Tammaraws. After her hiatus on playing volleyball, she signed a contract with the Generika-Ayala Lifesavers and debut on the 2017 PSL All-Filipino Conference as their team captain until the 2017 PSL Invitational Cup. She continued playing for the club until the 2017 PSL Grand Prix Conference after leaving the team and continuing her career for the Foton Tornadoes on the 2018 PSL All-Filipino Conference.

Clubs
  Generika-Ayala Lifesavers (2016-2017)
  Foton Tornadoes (2018-2020)
2016-2017
  Marinerang Pilipina (2020-2021)
  BaliPure Purest Water Defenders (2021-2022)
  Akari Power Chargers (2022-2023)
  Cignal HD Spikers (2023-present)

References

1994 births
Living people
Philippines women's international volleyball players
Filipino women's volleyball players
Far Eastern University alumni
University Athletic Association of the Philippines volleyball players
Middle blockers
Sportspeople from Negros Occidental
Competitors at the 2017 Southeast Asian Games
Southeast Asian Games competitors for the Philippines